Puerto El Carmen de Putumayo is a town in Sucumbíos Province in Ecuador. It also known as Puerto Carmen de Putumayo and is the seat of canton of Putumayo. The town is located on the San Miguel River and also has an airstrip. With a Populatión of nearly 5.000 inhabitants, Puerto Putumayo as it is sometimes called in the town has nearly half the population of the Putumayo Canton and it is famous for being the easternmost city/town access by road. The national route E10 terminates here nearly 450 km from San Lorenzo, Esmeraldas. Even though it is the easternmost city/town reachable by road, That title goes to the town of Nuevo Rocafuerte in neighbouring Orellana Province. The town of 2.000 inhabitants is only reachable by boat similar to the cases in the amazonian towns of Neighbour Peru. It is also known to be in the same longitude as Tarapoto, Peru at 75W longitude.

References

Populated places in Sucumbíos Province